Colin Tinsley (born 24 October 1935) is an English former footballer who made 214 appearances in the Football League playing for Grimsby Town, Darlington, Exeter City and Luton Town in the 1950s and 1960s. A goalkeeper, he also made 70 appearances in all competitions for Southern League club Kettering Town.

Tinsley is an actively practising Christian.

References

1935 births
Living people
People from Redcar
English footballers
Association football goalkeepers
Grimsby Town F.C. players
Darlington F.C. players
Exeter City F.C. players
Luton Town F.C. players
Kettering Town F.C. players
English Football League players
Southern Football League players
British Christians
Sportspeople from Yorkshire